Carl Speyer (1845–1???) was a German socialist active in Germany, London and the United States of America.

He was a member of the board of the Arbeiter Zeitung and secretary of the Vereingte Tischler New Yorks, a German joiners union based in the city, as well as a founding member of the International Labor Union established in Paterson, New Jersey in December 1878.

References

1845 births
Date of death missing
American people of German descent
German socialists
American trade union leaders
American newspaper executives